Fréttatíminn (Icelandic for: Newstime) was an Icelandic newspaper founded in 2010, with the first edition being published on 1 October that year. The newspaper came out every Friday, and had a circulation of approximately 82,000. Around 70,000 copies where distributed in the Reykjavík capital area. Fréttatíminn was free of charge. It went bankrupt in 2017, with its last edition being published on April 7 that year.

References

External links 
 Official website

Defunct newspapers published in Iceland
2010 establishments in Iceland
Newspapers established in 2010
Mass media in Reykjavík
2017 disestablishments in Iceland
Publications disestablished in 2017
Defunct weekly newspapers
Weekly newspapers published in Iceland